Andy Saunders (born 14 September 1994) is a former Australian professional rugby league footballer. He previously played for the Canterbury-Bankstown Bulldogs in the National Rugby League. He is a former Penrith Panthers National Youth Championship  Captain and has played over 100 games in the NRL's second tier reserve grade competition.

Background
Born in Quirindi, New South Wales, Saunders is of Italian descent. He played his junior rugby league for the Quirindi Grasshoppers before being signed by the Penrith Panthers.

Playing career

Early career
In 2013 and 2014, Saunders played for the Penrith Panthers' NYC team. In October 2013, he played in the Panthers' NYC premiership win over the New Zealand Warriors. In 2014, he took over the captaincy of the Panthers' NYC team. In September 2014, he was named at prop in the 2014 NYC Team of the Year and played in the Panthers' New South Wales Cup premiership win over the Newcastle Knights. In October 2014, he played for the Junior Kangaroos against the Junior Kiwis.

2017
In February, Saunders signed with the Canterbury-Bankstown Bulldogs for the 2017 season. In May, he played for the New South Wales Residents against the Queensland Residents. In July, he made his NRL debut for the Bulldogs during their round 18 match against the Newcastle Knights.

References

External links

Canterbury-Bankstown Bulldogs profile

1994 births
Australian people of Italian descent
Sportspeople of Italian descent
Australian rugby league players
Canterbury-Bankstown Bulldogs players
Junior Kangaroos players
Rugby league props
Living people
Rugby league players from New South Wales